Gura Caliței is a commune located in Vrancea County, Romania. It is composed of ten villages: Bălănești, Cocoșari, Dealu Lung, Groapa Tufei, Gura Caliței, Lacu lui Baban, Plopu, Poenile, Rașca and Șotârcari.

References

Communes in Vrancea County
Localities in Muntenia